Ianthellidae is a family of sponges belonging to the order Verongiida.

Genera:
 Anomoianthella Bergquist, 1980 
 Basta Pallas, 1766 
 Hexadella Topsent, 1896 
 Ianthella Gray, 1869 
 Vansoestia Díaz, Thacker, Redmond, Pérez & Collins, 2015

References

Verongimorpha
Sponge families